A Million a Minute is a lost 1916 American silent drama film directed by John W. Noble and starring Francis X. Bushman, Beverly Bayne and Robert Cummings. The film is based on a novel, A Million a Minute: A Romance of Modern New York and Paris by Robert Aitken. John W. Noble, a regular director for Metro releases, did directing honors.

Cast
Francis X. Bushman as Stephen Quaintance
Beverly Bayne as Dagmar Lorraine
Robert Cummings as Timothy O'Farrell
William Bailey as Mark Seager
Helen Dunbar as Fanchette
John Davidson as Duke de Reves
Charles Prince as Jules, His Valet
Mrs. Allen Walker as Mrs Smith (billed as Mrs. Walker)
Carlton Brickert as Stephen Quaintance Sr. (billed as Carl Brickert)
Mary Moore as Ellen Sheridan
Jerome N. Wilson as Miles Quaintance (billed as Jerome Wilson)

See also
Francis X. Bushman filmography

References

Bibliography
 Goble, Alan. The Complete Index to Literary Sources in Film. Walter de Gruyter, 1999.

External links

Original lobby poster (*if page don't load then click-> worthpoint link then return and click)

1916 films
1916 romantic drama films
American romantic drama films
1910s English-language films
American silent feature films
Lost romantic drama films
Films directed by John W. Noble
American black-and-white films
Metro Pictures films
Lost American films
Films based on American novels
1916 lost films
1910s American films
Silent romantic drama films
Silent American drama films